Alejandro Pérez (born May 3, 1986) is an American professional boxer in the Super Featherweight division.

Pro career
On March 25, 2011 Alejandro Pérez upset title contender Antonio Escalante, the bout was televised on TeleFutura.

References

External links

American boxers of Mexican descent
Boxers from California
Super-featherweight boxers
1986 births
Living people
American male boxers
People from Salinas, California